Familia is a 1996 Spanish-French comedy-drama film written and directed by Fernando León de Aranoa.

Plot 
Santiago, a 55-year-old lonely man, hires a company of thespians to act as if they were his family on his birthday.

Cast

Production 
Familia was produced by Elías Querejeta PC, Albares Production and MGM Filmes, with the participation of Televisión Española, Canal+ España and ESICMA and the support from Eurimages. It was shot in Madrid from 14 April to 17 June 1996. Outdoor shooting locations included the district of Chamartín.

Release 
Distributed by Alta Films, the film was theatrically released on 24 January 1997.

Following its release, the film was adapted into a stage play.

Awards and nominations 

|-
| align = "center" rowspan = "2" | 1998 || rowspan = "2" | 12th Goya Awards || Best New Director || Fernando León de Aranoa ||  || rowspan = "2" | 
|-
| Best Original Screenplay || Fernando León de Aranoa || 
|}

See also 
 List of Spanish films of 1996

References 
Citations

Bibliography

External links 
 Familia at ICAA's Catálogo de Cinespañol
 

1990s Spanish-language films
1996 films
Spanish comedy-drama films
Films directed by Fernando León de Aranoa
Films shot in Madrid
1990s Spanish films